Encore une chance (meaning Again a chance in French, full title Encore une chance: Les plus belles voix de la téléréalités (meaning Again a chance: the most beautiful voices of reality television in French) is a French reality television show broadcast on French music television network NRJ 12 in January and February 2012, and comprising six shows with the first on 24 January 2012 and the finals on 27 February. The music competition gave a new chance to 32 contestants in various music competition shows in France that had failed to win in their bids giving them a new chance with two winners signing contracts with NRJ and given chances to record with established artist. The winner in the female category was Lucie Azard, a contestant from French Star Academy in season 7 held in 2007-2008. She won the chance to record in cooperation with Canadian singer K.Maro.

The winner in the female category was Lucie Azard, a contestant from French Star Academy in season 7 held in 2007-2008. She won the chance to record in cooperation with Canadian singer K.Maro.

Due to lower than expected viewership of the program, the series was moved from prime time to late night slot for the second half of the series.

Jury
The jury was composed of music professionals: 
Richard Cross - a vocal coach
Mia Frye - choreographer
Morgan Serrano - DJ at NRJ Radio
Stéphane Joffre-Roméas, a director at NRJ 12.

Contestants
The 32 contestants, 16 male and 16 female, with none of them winners in the series they took part in, came from the following musical reality television series (winners in bold):

Finalists / Winners
The 8 finalists who had the chance to compete in an episode registered in Canada were:
Jessie Amseli
Lucie Azard
Cynthia Brown
Tigane Drammeh
Larry Lambert
Nedjim Mahtallah
Bruno Rua
Anne-Laure Sibon

The 2012 winner in the male category was Larry Lambert, originally a contestant in Nouvelle Star in season 7 of the series in 2009. He won a chance to record in cooperation with Canadian singer Corneille.

The winner in the female category was Lucie Azard, a contestant from French Star Academy in season 7 held in 2007-2008. She won the chance to record in cooperation with Canadian singer K.Maro.

Results table

Viewers

References

French music television series
NRJ 12 original programming